Northern Lehigh High School is a public high school located in Slatington, Pennsylvania. It is the only high school in the Northern Lehigh School District. Students in grades 9 through 12 from Slatington, Walnutport, and Washington Township in the Lehigh Valley region of eastern Pennsylvania attend the high school.

As of the 2021-22 school year, the school had an enrollment of 470 students, according to National Center for Education Statistics data.

Northern Lehigh competes in the District XI athletic division of the Pennsylvania Interscholastic Athletic Association and is a member of the Colonial League.

History
The current high school building was completed in 1981. An addition was added in 2000 for a new library and art room. Prior buildings, which housed the school include:

Lincoln Building (1890–1915) (Chestnut Alley & Kuntz Street)
"Old High School at Main Street" (1916–1958) (2nd & Main Streets)
(Currently) Northern Lehigh Middle School (1958–1981) (Top of Kuehner Hill; Bulldog Lane)
(Currently) Northern Lehigh High School (1982–present) (Bulldog Lane & Snyder Avenue)

The high school had been known as Slatington High School until the name was changed to Northern Lehigh High School in 1981, with the first class graduating in 1982.

Academics
Northern Lehigh High School operates on a semester system. The school year has two semesters, each with four 86 minute class periods. Students are also offered the opportunity to take vocational training at Lehigh Career and Technical Institute and can take college courses offered through Lehigh Carbon Community College.

Athletics

Main rivals
Northern Lehigh's main sports rivalries are closely aligned with geographic proximity. Northern Lehigh and Palmerton High School have had a strong rivalry for decades. From 1946-74, both school's football teams met for a Thanksgiving Day game, and the teams still end their regular seasons each year by playing one another. A natural rivalry has also developed with Northwestern Lehigh High School, which was once a part of Northern Lehigh School District until the 1950s.

Teams
Northern Lehigh fields teams for interscholastic competition in a number of sports including, baseball, boys and girls cross country, boys and girls soccer, boys and girls track and field, field hockey, football, boys and girls basketball, wrestling, and softball.

PIAA state champions
Since its founding, Northern Lehigh High School has won PIAA state championships in the following sports and seasons:
Softball: 1988 ("AA"), 96 ("AA")
Wrestling: 1985 ("AA"), 2005 ("AA")

PIAA state qualifiers
Northern Lehigh High School has qualified for the PIAA state tournament in the following sports and years:
Boys Basketball: 1982, 2007, 08, 12
Girls Basketball: 1992, 93, 2010, 11
Boys Cross Country: 1974, 78, 79, 80, 87, 89, 92, 94, 95, 97, 98, 99, 2001, 09
Girls Cross Country: 1975, 85, 86, 2007
Football: 1999, 2003, 10
Softball:1988, 96, 98, 2000, 01
Wrestling: 1985, 99, 2000, 05, 06, 08, 15

PIAA Eastern PA champions

Boys Basketball: 1982
Football: 2003
Softball:1988, 96, 98
Wrestling: 1999, 2000, 05, 06

Eastern Conference Playoff AA champions

Football: 2014

District XI champions
Northern Lehigh High School has won PIAA District 11 championships in the following sports and seasons:
Boys Basketball: 1954, 2008
Baseball: 1954
Boys Cross Country: 1980, 92, 95, 97, 99
Girls Cross Country: 1975, 85
Football: 1999, 2003, 10
Softball: 1993, 94, 96, 98, 00, 01, 19
Wrestling: 1986, 97, 98, 99, 2000, 05, 06, 09, 15

Colonial League champions
Northern Lehigh High School joined the Colonial League in 1994. Their Colonial League championships since include:
Baseball: 2010
Boys Basketball: 2007, 08, 10
Boys Cross Country: 1994, 95, 97, 99
Field Hockey: 2013
Football: 1999, 2002, 03, 05, 10
Softball: 1994, 2010, 2018
Boys Track: 1999, 2004
Wrestling: 1997, 98, 99, 04, 05, 06

Centennial League champions
Northern Lehigh High School joined the Centennial League in 1975 and was in the league through the end of the 1993 season. Their Centennial championships during this period include:
Baseball: 1984, 85, 86
Boys Basketball: 1978, 81, 82, 83, 84, 85, 88
Girls Basketball: 1984
Boys Cross Country: 1977, 78, 79, 80, 81, 86, 87, 88, 89, 92, 93
Girls Cross Country: 1985, 86, 87
Football: 1981
Softball:1988, 89, 92, 93, 94, 95
Boys Track: 1978, 79, 81
Wrestling: 1982, 83, 90

Lehigh Valley champions
Boys Basketball: 1926, 27, 53, 54
Baseball: 1939, 51, 53, 54
Football: 1968, 69, 74
Boys Track: 1966
Girls Track: 1975

Ring of Honor

Beginning in 2007, each year six individuals who have made a significant impact on athletics at either Northern Lehigh High School or Slatington High School. The honor has included former athletes, coaches, and members of the community who have made contributions to promote high school athletics.

Notable individual accomplishments

On January 7, 2012, Northern Lehigh High School's Aimee Oertner achieved a quintuple double-double (a performance in which a player accumulates a double-digit number total in all five statistical categories (points, rebounds, assists, steals, and blocked shots) in a single game. In 2012, this feat had only been accomplished two other times in basketball history.

On October 3, 2018, David Oertner earned his 1000th win as the Northern Lehigh cross country coach. He is also the father of Aimee Oertner and was her high school basketball coach. As of 2018, he had over 90 seasons of coaching as a head or assistant coach of various sports at Northern Lehigh High School.

Arts

Marching Band
Tournament of Bands Chapter II Champions (Group 1): 1999, 2006, 2007, 2009, 2017, 2018, 2019
Tournament of Bands Atlantic Coast Championships Finalists: 1997, 98, 99, 2000, 03, 04, 05, 06, 07, 08, 09, 10, 11, 12, 13, 14, 15, 16, 17, 18, 19
Tournament of Bands Top 5 Finish at Atlantic Coast Championships: 2011 – 4th of 30 group 1 bands; 2013 – 3rd of 23 bands; 2015 – 4th of 26 bands;2016 – 5th of 19 bands;2017-5th of 20 bands; 2018-4th of 20 bands; 2019-4th of 20 bands
Tournament of Bands Chapter II High Percussion (Group 1): 1999, 2005, 2007, 2009
Tournament of Bands ACC Section champions: 2013 Woodwinds

Freddy Awards
Outstanding Performance by an Orchestra: 2011, "Once On This Island"
Outstanding Use of Scenery: 2011, "Once On This Island"
Outstanding Use of Scenery: 2013, "Little Shop of Horrors"
Outstanding Featured Performance by an Actor: 2014, "Dirty Rotten Scoundrels"
Outstanding Featured Performance by an Actor-Won by Pierce McGowan:2017, " Disney's Beauty and the Beast"
Outstanding Performance by a Male Ensemble Member-won by Pierce McGowan:2018, “Sweeney Todd:The Demon Barber of Fleet Street”
Outstanding Overall Production By a SmallerSchool:2018,“Sweeney Todd:The Demon Barber of Fleet Street”

NLHS alma mater

The lyrics to the song were written by Charles Schoffstall, a commercial teacher between 1917 and 1920. It is played to the tune of Annie Lisle.

Lyrics:

Just above the winding Lehigh
Midst the mountains grand
Stands our dear old Alma Mater
Famed throughout the land.

Far and wide through we may sojourn,
Still our hearts are true,
To our dear old Alma Mater,
Dear old white and blue

Chorus:
High school, high school, our own high school
Dear N.L.H.S.
When afar from the we wander,
Thy dear name we bless.

Former school mascots

Early 1930s – Blue and White Warriors
1939–1941 – Blue and White Raiders
1941–1968 – Slatington Slaters
1968–1981 – Slatington Bulldogs

Notable alumni

Sigrid Close, professor, aeronautics and astronautics at Stanford University and recipient of the Presidential Early Career Award for Scientists and Engineers
George Hennessey, former professional baseball player, Chicago Cubs, St. Louis Browns and Philadelphia Phillies
Charles Johnson, former professional baseball player, Philadelphia Phillies
Thomas R. Morgan, former assistant commandant of the U.S. Marine Corps

References

External links

Lehigh High School athletics official website
Northern Lehigh High School on Facebook
Northern Lehigh High School athletics on Twitter
Northern Lehigh High School sports coverage at The Express-Times

1981 establishments in Pennsylvania
Educational institutions established in 1981
Public high schools in Pennsylvania
Schools in Lehigh County, Pennsylvania